The Fournier RF 5 is a two-seat motor glider designed by René Fournier.

Design and development
The RF 5 is based on the single seater Fournier RF 4, and is a low-winged monoplane of all-wooden construction, with the crew of two sat in a tandem enclosed cockpit. It is semi-aerobatic with loops, stall turns, lazy eights, chandelles and spins approved. It has a manually rectractable center landing gear, a steerable tailwheel and detachable outrigger landing gear. Spoilers are available to reduce lift. The wingtips of the parked aircraft can be unlocked and folded inwards by a single person to reduce required hangar space.

Variants
RF 5B An improved high-performance version. Powered by a 50.7 kW (68 hp) Limbach SL 1700 E Comet engine.
RF 5B Sperber A high performance powered sailplane with  span wings.
AeroJaén RF5-AJ1 Serrania
License built version produced by Aeronáutica del Jaén SA

Specifications (RF 5)

See also

References

Fournier aircraft
1960s French sailplanes
Motor gliders
Low-wing aircraft
Single-engined tractor aircraft
Aircraft first flown in 1968